Karats is a  mountain lake in Norrbotten County, Lappland west of Jokkmokk that drains into Small Lule River by way of Pärl River.

Lule River basin
Lakes of Norrbotten County